Alan John Hopgood  AM (29 September 1934 – 19 March 2022), also known as Alan Hopwood, was an Australian actor, producer, and writer. He wrote the screenplay for the 1972 film Alvin Purple and made appearances in television shows such as Bellbird, Prisoner and Neighbours.

Early life 

Hopgood was born in Launceston, Tasmania, and grew up in the state. He acted in several dramatic roles in his childhood. He attended school in Melbourne and then studied at the University of Melbourne, graduating with a Bachelor of Arts (Hon) and a Diploma of Education. His first play, Marcus, was produced at Melbourne University while he was working as a school teacher. He left teaching to write full-time and start his acting career.

Career

Scriptwriting and screenwriting

Hopgood's first successful play, And the Big Men Fly, was about Australian rules football and was produced in 1963 by the Union Theatre Repertory Company at the Russell Street Theatre in Melbourne with scripts by Brad Hopgood. The play was adapted for TV by the Australian Broadcasting Corporation in 1973 and also a telemovie. In 1964, he followed with The Golden Legion of Cleaning Women. In 1966 he produced Private Yuk Objects, which he said was the first play anywhere in the world on the subject of the Vietnam War.

Hopgood has also written a number of film and television screenplays, including the comedy film Alvin Purple (1973), which was the most commercially successful Australian film of the early 1970s.

Screen actor: Television and film

Hopgood was an actor with the Melbourne Theatre Company for ten years and was an early "soap" star in Bellbird, in which for six years he played the town doctor. He has also performed in the later soaps, Prisoner (for which he also scripted many episodes) and Neighbours as Jack Lassiter (a role he reprised in August 2013).

As an actor, his cinema credits include My Brilliant Career (1979), The Blue Lagoon (1980), Roadgames (1981), Evil Angels (1988, released as A Cry in the Dark outside of Australia and New Zealand) and The Man from Snowy River II (1988). 

He worked with a large number of actors including Frank Thring, Meryl Streep, Brooke Shields, Sam Neill and Judy Davis.

In late 2021, Hopgood appeared in an exclusive interview for the official YouTube channel "Talking Prisoner", in which he discussed his life and career. The episode was published in January 2022.

Honours 

Hopgood won AWGIE awards for The Cheerful Cuckold and The Bush Bunch and writing several feature films including Alvin Purple and the documentaries The Prophecies of Nostradamus and The Fountain of Youth.

Hopgood was awarded the A.M. (Member of the Order of Australia) in 2005 for his services to the performing arts as an actor, playwright and producer, and to the community through raising awareness of men's health issues.

Health issues and death
Alan Hopgood developed prostate cancer and published a book on the experience titled "Surviving Prostate Cancer - One Man's Journey, which was widely praised. He ofter toured giving  humorous lectures on mens health issues.

Hopgood died from prostate cancer at the age of 87 on 19 March 2022 at a hospital in Melbourne.

Filmography

Actor

Writing credits

References

External links
 
 Bay Street Productions
 Holly's Heroes
Alan Hopgood at AustLit
 

1934 births
2022 deaths
Australian dramatists and playwrights
Australian male film actors
Australian screenwriters
Australian male soap opera actors
Australian male stage actors 
Deaths from cancer in Victoria (Australia) 
Deaths from prostate cancer
People from Launceston, Tasmania
University of Melbourne alumni
20th-century Australian male actors
21st-century Australian male actors
Members of the Order of Australia